Twycross is a small village and civil parish in the Hinckley and Bosworth district, in Leicestershire, England, on the A444 road. The population of the civil parish at the 2011 census was 850. The civil parish includes the villages of Norton Juxta Twycross and Orton on the Hill and the hamlets of Little Orton and Little Twycross, as well as Twycross Zoo, and the selective, private Twycross House School.

The Twycross Cricket Club is a village club with a 1st and 2nd XI who play in the Leicestershire Senior League. It also has a Sunday XI which plays many friendly games throughout the season.

The 1st team XI play regularly in the Premier division, whilst the 2nd team XI play in division 3, which hosts a 1st team and 2nd teams while also holding a Sunday friendly team. It has a youth set-up with under-15, under-13, and under-11 teams.

The church of St. James contains the oldest stained glass in England, originally from Sainte-Chapelle, Saint-Denis, and Le Mans Cathedral. The earliest glass is c.1145 from Saint-Denis, the panels having been presented to William IV who gave them to Earl Howe, who got the glazier Thomas Willement to arrange and install them in the church during its restoration in the 1840s.

Twycross is the home of Rare, a video game developer owned by Xbox Game Studios.

History 
It is named 'Twycross' because its centre lies at the intersection of three roads. The A444 connects it to Burton-on-Trent and Coventry and the B4116/B4114 to Birmingham.

On 1 April 1935 the parishes of Gopsall, Norton juxta Twycross and Orton on the Hill were merged with Twycross.

References

External links

 
Villages in Leicestershire
Civil parishes in Leicestershire
Hinckley and Bosworth